Custom Nation is a nonfiction book written by Anthony Flynn and Emily Flynn Vencat. It was published on November 15, 2012 by BenBella Books. The text examines customization in today's market and in American culture. The book's full title is Custom Nation: Why Customization Is the Future of Business and How to Profit from it.

Background
The book was written by Anthony Flynn, the co-founder of YouBar, a custom energy bar company, together with  his sister, Emily Flynn Vencat, a journalist. 
 
The book  was published on November 15, 2012 by BenBella Books. The book is 224 pages in length.

Plot
Custom Nation examines the trend in today's market towards customizable products. It looks at Vistaprint, Shutterfly, Zazzle, CafePress, Starbucks, Dell, Subway, and other companies whose business concepts depend on customization.
 
Custom Nation includes chapters on mass production, the inception of customization, advice for how to launch a customization-based business, advice for how to add customization to an existing business, and methods to grow and market a customization business.

Awards

Custom Nation was ranked #8 on the New York Times Best Seller list in early December 2012. USA Today ranked Custom Nation #94 on its Best seller list. Publishers Weekly ranked Custom Nation #12 on its Bestsellers list. Custom Nation was ranked  #78 in Amazon.com's Management and Leadership category, sub listed under Planning and Forecasting. Custom Nation was also ranked #53 on Amazon's Best seller list for Management and Leadership sub listed under Production and Operations books. It was ranked #150 on Amazon's general content Best seller list.
 
Publishers Weekly reviewed the book in September 2012, writing that Custom Nation was an excellent instruction manual for businesses looking to use customized products to grow further.

References

2012 non-fiction books
Business books
BenBella Books books